The following table lists the names of Breton communities which have concluded town twinning agreements with communities in Ireland:

See also 
 List of Welsh towns twinned with a Breton town

External links
Breizh-Iwerzhon Association
Breizh-Iwerzhon Association, federation of Côtes-d'Armor (Brittany) 
References about the twinning

Communes in Brittany
Towns in Ireland
Ireland
Twin towns
Twin towns